Ideal Institute of Engineering, is an engineering college situated at Kalyani, West Bengal, India offers degree engineering courses which are affiliated to Maulana Abul Kalam Azad University of Technology formerly known as West Bengal University of Technology (WBUT).

See also

References

External links 

https://web.archive.org/web/20090619091259/http://www.wbut.net/

Universities and colleges in Nadia district
Colleges affiliated to West Bengal University of Technology
Kalyani, West Bengal
Educational institutions in India with year of establishment missing